Michael McKernan (born 27 October 1997) is a Gaelic footballer who plays for the Coalisland club and the Tyrone county team.

Honours
Tyrone
 All-Ireland Senior Football Championship (1): 2021
 Ulster Senior Football Championship (1): 2021

Coalisland
 Tyrone Senior Football Championship (1): 2018

References

Living people
Tyrone inter-county Gaelic footballers
1997 births